Tecolote is an unincorporated community and census-designated place in San Miguel County, New Mexico, United States. Its population was 298 as of the 2010 census. The community is located along Interstate 25 at Exit 335.

Geography

Demographics

Education
It is in the West Las Vegas Schools school district. West Las Vegas High School is the area high school.

References

Census-designated places in New Mexico
Census-designated places in San Miguel County, New Mexico